Bydgoszcz Department (Polish: Departament bydgoski) was a unit of administrative division and local government in Polish Duchy of Warsaw in years 1806–1815.

Its capital city was Bydgoszcz.

Following the Decree of 19 December 1807, the area was further divided onto 10 counties (powiats).

Sources
Jacek Arkadiusz Goclon, Polska na królu pruskim zdobyta, Wydawnictwo Uniwersytetu Wrocławskiego, Wrocław 2002.
Mieczysław Bandurka, Zmiany administracyjne i terytorialne ziem województwa łódzkiego w XIX i XX wieku, NDAP, UW w Łodzi, AP w Łodzi, Łódź 1995.

References

Departments of the Duchy of Warsaw
History of Bydgoszcz
States and territories established in 1806
States and territories disestablished in 1815